Doric, the popular name for Mid Northern Scots or Northeast Scots, refers to the Scots language as spoken in the northeast of Scotland. There is an extensive body of literature, mostly poetry, ballads, and songs, written in Doric. In some literary works, Doric is used as the language of conversation while the rest of the work is in Lallans Scots or British English. A number of 20th and 21st century poets have written poetry in the Doric dialect.

Nomenclature
The term "Doric" was formerly used to refer to all dialects of Lowland Scots, but during the twentieth century it became increasingly associated with Mid Northern Scots.

The name possibly originated as a jocular reference to the Doric dialect of the Ancient Greek language. Greek Dorians lived in Laconia, including Sparta, and other more rural areas, and were alleged by the ancient Greeks to have spoken laconically and in a language thought harsher in tone and more phonetically conservative than the Attic spoken in Athens. Doric Greek was used for some of the verses spoken by the chorus in Greek tragedy.

According to The Oxford Companion to English Literature:

"Since the Dorians were regarded as uncivilised by the Athenians, 'Doric' came to mean 'rustic' in English, and was applied particularly to the language of Northumbria and the Lowlands of Scotland and also to the simplest of the three orders in architecture."

18th-century Scots writers such as Allan Ramsay justified their use of Scots (instead of English) by comparing it to the use of Ancient Greek Doric by Theocritus. English became associated with Attic.

Phonology
Most consonants are usually pronounced much as in other Modern Scots dialects but:

Some vowel realisations differ markedly from those of Central Scots dialects. The vowel numbers are from Aitken. See also Cardinal vowels.

In Buchan, in some words the stem final w may be realised , often with a  glide before the preceding vowel, for example awe  (awe), blaw  (blow), gnaw , law , snaw  (snow) and taw ~ often written yaave, blyaave, snyaave and tyauve~tyaave~chaave in dialect writing.
In some areas ai or a (consonant) e  (vowel 4 or 8) may be realised  after , dark  and occasionally after other consonants, for example claes (clothes), coal, coat, gape, wade, waik (weak), wait, wale (choose) and wame (belly), often written clyes, kwile, gype, wyde, wyke, wyte, wyle and wyme in dialect writing. A preceding  or  may produce a  glide, with the vowel realised , for example caird  (card), cake , naig  (nag) and nakit  (naked). The cluster ane is realised  in Moray and Nairn but is usually  in other areas, for example, ane (one) ance (once), bane (bone) and stane (stone), often written een, eence, been and steen in dialect writing.
ea, ei (vowel 3) is usually , though the realisation may be  along the coast and in Moray and Nairn.
ee (vowels 2 and 11), e(Consonant)e (vowel 2). Occasionally ei and ie with ei generally before ch, but also in a few other words, and ie generally occurring before l and v.
eu (vowel 7 before  and  see ui), sometimes ui and oo after Standard English also occur, is generally  in for example, beuk (book), eneuch (enough), ceuk (cook), leuk (look) and teuk (took).
Before  the realisation may be  in, for example, week, often written wyke in dialect writing.
Also u (consonant) e, especially before nasals, and oo from the spelling of Standard English cognates, in for example, abuin (above), cuit (ankle) and guid (good), often written abeen, queet and gweed in dialect writing. In Moray and Nairn the realisation is usually  before  in, for example, buird (board), fluir (floor) and fuird (ford), often written boord, floor and foord in dialect writing. The realisation  also occurs in adae (ado), dae (do), shae (shoe) and tae (to~too).

Literature

North East Scots has an extensive body of literature, mostly poetry, ballads and songs. During the Middle Scots period writing from the North East of Scotland adhered to the literary conventions of the time; indications of particular "Doric" pronunciations were very rare. The 18th century literary revival also brought forth writers from the North East but, again, local dialect features were rare, the extant literary Scots conventions being preferred. In later times, a more deliberately regional literature began to emerge.

In contemporary prose writing, Doric occurs usually as quoted speech, although this is less and less often the case. As is usually the case with marginalised languages, local loyalties prevail in the written form, showing how the variety "deviates" from standard ("British") English as opposed to a general literary Scots "norm". This shows itself in the local media presentation of the language, e.g., Grampian Television & The Aberdeen Press and Journal. These local loyalties, waning knowledge of the older literary tradition and relative distance from the Central Lowlands ensure that the Doric scene has a degree of semi-autonomy.

Doric dialogue was used in a lot of so-called Kailyard literature, a genre that paints a sentimental, melodramatic picture of the old rural life, and is currently unfashionable. This negative association still plagues Doric literature to a degree, as well as Scottish literature in general.

Poets who wrote in the Doric dialect include John M. Caie of Banffshire (1879–1949), Helen B. Cruickshank of Angus (1886–1975), Alexander Fenton (1929–2012), Flora Garry (1900–2000), Sir Alexander Gray (1882–1968), Violet Jacob of Angus (1863–1946), Charles Murray (1864–1941) and J. C. Milne (1897–1962).

George MacDonald from Huntly used Doric in his novels. A friend of Mark Twain, he is commonly considered one of the fathers of the fantasy genre and an influence on C. S. Lewis and J. R. R. Tolkien.

Lewis Grassic Gibbon's Scots Quair trilogy is set in the Mearns and has been the basis of a successful play and television series. It is very popular throughout Scotland and tells the story of Chris, an independent-minded woman, mainly in a form of English strongly influenced by the rhythms of local speech.

A version of Aesop's Fables has been published in Doric, as well as some sections of the Bible.

The North East has been claimed as the "real home of the ballad" and, according to Les Wheeler, "91 out of a grand total of (Child's) 305 ballads came from the North East – in fact from Aberdeenshire", which makes the usual name of "Border Ballad" a misnomer put about by Sir Walter Scott.

Contemporary writers in Doric include Sheena Blackhall, a poet who writes in Doric, and Mo Simpson, who writes in the Aberdeen Evening Express and peppers her humour column with "Doricisms" and Doric words. Doric has also featured in stage, radio and television, notably in the sketches and songs of the Aberdeen-based comedy groups Scotland the What? and the Flying Pigs.

Sample text
Gin I was God by Charles Murray (1864–1941) 

Doric

Translation
IF I were God, sitting up there above,
Wearied no doubt, now all my work was done,
Deafened by the harps and hymns unending ringing,
Tired of the flocking angels hoarse with singing,
To some cloud edge I'd saunter forth and, faith,
Look over and watch how things were going beneath.
Then if I saw how men I'd made myself
Had started out to poison, shoot and kill [fell],
To steal and rape and fairly make a hell
Of my fine spinning Earth—a whole week's work—
I'd drop my coat again, roll up my shirt,
And, ere they'd time to launch a second ark,
Take back my word and send another flood [spate],
Drown out the whole shebang, wipe the slate,
Admit my mistake, and once I'd cleared the board,
Start everything ["all-thing"] over again, if I were God.

Recent developments
In 2006 an Aberdeen hotel decided to use a Doric voice for their lift. Phrases said by the lift include "Gyaun Up"  (Going up), "Gyaun Doun"  (Going down), "atween fleers een an fower"  (between floors one and four).

Also in 2006, Maureen Watt of the SNP took her Scottish Parliamentary oath in Doric. She said "I want to advance the cause of Doric and show there's a strong and important culture in the North East." She was required to take an oath in English beforehand. There was some debate as to whether the oath was "gweed Doric" or not, and notably it is, to a certain extent, written phonetically and contains certain anglicised forms such as "I" rather than "A", and "and" instead of "an":

"I depone aat I wull be leal and bear ae full alleadgance tae her majesty Queen Elizabeth her airs an ony fa come aifter her anent the law. Sae help me God."

In Disney/Pixar's Brave, the character Young MacGuffin speaks the Doric dialect, and a running joke involves no one else understanding him. This was a choice by the voice actor, Kevin McKidd, a native of Elgin.

In autumn 2020, the University of Aberdeen launched a term-long Doric course, offering it to all its undergraduate students.

In August 2012, Gordon Hay, an Aberdeenshire author, successfully completed what is believed to be the first translation of the New Testament into Doric. The project took him six years.

See also
 Modern Scots
Shetland dialect
 Ulster Scots
 Norn language

References

Sources
 Harper, Norman, Spik O The Place (Canongate Books, 1998)
 Harper, Norman (2009) Spikkin Doric. Edinburgh. Birlinn.

External links

 Doric A-Z words and phrases
 Technical description of Doric pronunciation
 Aw Ae Wey—Written Scots in Scotland and Ulster
 North East page at Scots Language Centre
 'Hover & Hear' Doric pronunciations, and compare with other accents from the UK and around the World.
 Hear Doric spoken aloud
 The Doric Festival
 Scottish MSP takes oath in Doric
 Anglic Language Varieties of Northern Scotland (from the Internet Archive - original link down).
 List of Doric Words and English Translations
 Doric set to dae the business
 Hotel lands uplifting Doric voice
 'Fit Like, Yer Majesty?' a book of Doric poems published in 2008
 Doric language and area stories from the North East of Scotland
 David Jack reads Doric passages from the works of George MacDonald, with some annotated texts: Spikin' Scots wi' Dawvid Jack, YouTube channel
 Scotland's little-known fourth "language" (BBC)

Scots dialects
Culture in Aberdeen
Aberdeenshire
Banffshire
Moray